Rosina Fernhoff (born April 13, 1931) is an American actress known for her work in the theatre. She often performs plays that deal with Jewish themes.

Personal life
Fernhoff was born in New York City, the daughter of Austrian-Jewish immigrant parents Dr. William and Tola Fernhoff. She is a graduate of Carnegie Mellon with a B.F.A in Theatre and furthered her studies at Bank Street College of Education in New York City. She is the widow of artist, playwright, and director Avraham "Av" Inlender (d.2003). Her husband immigrated from Poland to Israel and the U.S. Both lost family members to the Holocaust. They have two daughters. Fernhoff studied acting with Lee Strasberg. She is a resident of New York City. She continues to perform in theater, film, and tour her one-woman shows. In August 2014, she performed in New York City at the Fresh Fruit Festival as Alice B. Toklas in The Conversion of Alice B. Toklas by Carol Polcovar.

Career

Fernhoff won an Obie Award for Best Actress in 1959 for her performance in two Off-Broadway plays, Fashion as Gertrude, by Anna Cora Mowatt, and The Geranium Hat as Anne-Betty by Bernard Evslin.

She is known for performing plays written by her husband, Av Inlender. These plays include Jerusalem Story, a play that relates the story of the kidnapping of a young boy in Israel for political gain, Mrs. Davidson's Story, which revolves around an American teacher in an Israeli school that is taken-over by terrorists and Shadows, the story of a Russian Jewish choreographer who through her personal story, pleads for asylum for imprisoned Jews in the Anti- Semitic Soviet Union.

"Snow People", a play adapted by Av Inlender from his novel, Zoa, also stars Fernhoff, as Anna Blake, the daughter of a Holocaust survivor who discovers fifty years later the Nazi's who terrorized her family. 
In 2006 Fernhoff performed Snow People at Colorado State University as a special guest for their Holocaust Awareness Week. She has performed these one-person shows at theaters, colleges and Synagogues across the United States, in Europe and Israel. In addition to acting, Fernhoff directs and coaches.

She is a member of Carnival Girls Productions and on November 15, 2014 she was honored with a Lifetime Achievement Award at Speyer Hall, University Settlement in New York City.

Fernhoff is fluent in Hebrew and German. In her youth she performed classic roles in Israel at the Cameri Theater such as Juliet in Romeo and Juliet. Her other credits include starring roles in The Glass Menagerie, Come Back, Little Sheba, Hamlet, The Piano Teacher, and The Quickening.

Film and television

In film she has appeared in supporting roles, Love Hunter (2013) and Bobby Dogs (2007). Ms. Fernhoff has appeared in numerous short films including Man of the House, which screened at the 2012 Cannes Film Festival.

References

External links
 
Rosina Fernhoff at Internet Off-Broadway Database

American stage actresses
Living people
Jewish American actresses
Actresses from New York (state)
Carnegie Mellon University College of Fine Arts alumni
American people of Austrian-Jewish descent
20th-century American actresses
21st-century American actresses
Obie Award recipients
American film actresses
Bank Street College of Education alumni
1931 births